Second System can refer to the following:
Proposed New York City Subway expansion (1929-1940)
Second-system effect in computer programming